Feffernitz is a sub-municipality of Paternion in the Villach-Land District of the Carinthia in Austria, the site of a post World War II British sector displaced person camp.

Cities and towns in Villach-Land District